The Vulcan Award of the Technical Artist is an independent film award created in 2003. It rewards the work of a technician for his or her collaboration in the creation of a film from the official selection of the Cannes Film Festival. It is awarded by a special jury, appointed by the Superior Technical Commission of Image and Sound ( or CST).

History
In 1951, the CST created the Technical Grand Prize of the CST, awarded during the Cannes Film Festival. That prize existed until 2001.

In 2003, Pierre-William Glenn, president of the CST, struggled to once again have a prize awarded to a technician during the Cannes Film Festival. Thus, the Vulcan Award of the Technical Artist was born as a part of the festival roster and approved by the festival's president Gilles Jacob.

Since 2021, the CST has also been awarding the CST Young Female Film Technician Prize, to highlight a young female head of station in French cinema.

The trophy
The actual trophy is awarded to the winner in Paris, during a special evening following the festival.

It is inspired by an image from Jean-Luc Godard's movie Le Mépris (Contempt) (1963) and represents a movie camera with analog and numeric elements.

Award winners

Vulcan Award (since 2003)

Technical Grand Prize (1951-2001)

References

Sources
  Award Winners list on the CST Website

External links
  Official Website of the CST
 Cannes Film Festival's Official Website

Lists of films by award
French film awards
Cannes Film Festival
Awards established in 2003